Charming the Hearts of Men is a 2021 American historical romantic drama film written and directed by S.E. DeRose and starring Kelsey Grammer, Anna Friel and Sean Astin.  It is inspired by true events during the Civil rights movement in 1964.

Cast
Anna Friel as Grace Gordon
Kelsey Grammer as Congressman
Starletta DuPois as Mattie
Pauline Dyer as Jubilee
Aml Ameen as Walter
Sean Astin as George
 Hendrix Yancey as Angelina
Jill Marie Jones as Viola
Tina Ivlev as Ruth
Diane Ladd as Alice Paul
Courtney Gains as Mr. Spratz
Curtis Hamilton as Andrew
Henry G. Sanders as Abel
Justice Leak as Dick
Tom Schanley as Bradford Lotts

Release
In June 2021, it was announced that Gravitas Ventures acquired North American distribution rights to the film, which was released in theaters and On Demand on August 13, 2021.

Reception
The film has an 80 percent rating on Rotten Tomatoes, based on 10 reviews.

Christian Gallichio of Film Threat rated the film a 5 out of 10 and wrote, "Despite the pedigree and performances, the overall political sentiments and underdeveloped script hold Charming the Hearts of Man back from presenting a fully realized portrait of the 1964 Civil Rights Act.”

References

External links
 
 

2020s English-language films
Films set in 1964